is located in Tenjimbashi Rokuchome, Kita-ku, Osaka, Japan.  Nicknamed, "Ten-roku", it is located on the Osaka Metro Tanimachi Line, the Sakaisuji Line and the Hankyu Railway Senri Line (also through trains to the Kyoto Line).

Until 1969 there was the terminal station of the Hankyū Senri Line named Tenjinbashi Station (天神橋駅) which opened in 1925. When the Sakaisuji Line subway opened, the station was replaced by the underground Tenjimbashisuji 6-chome Station. The station building (Ten-Roku Hankyu Building) and platforms remained until 2009, when the building was demolished to make way for high-rise condominiums.

The world's largest covered shopping street, known as the Tenjimbashisuji Shotengai, begins at Ten-roku.

Layout
There is an island platform with two tracks for each line.
Tanimachi Line (T18)

Sakaisuji Line (K11) and Hankyu Railway Senri Line

Gas explosion incident
On April 8, 1970, a gas explosion occurred during the construction of the Tanimachi Line at this station, killing 79 people and injuring 420. The gas leaked out from a detached joint and filled the tunnel and exploded, creating a fire pillar of over 10 meters and destroying 495 houses and buildings.

Stations next to Tenjimbashisuji Rokuchome

References

External links
 The Tenjimbashisuji Shotengai
 Photos
  Tenjimbashisuji 6-chome Station from Hankyu Railway website
  Tenjimashisuji Rokuchōme Station - Sakiasuji Line from Osaka Metro website
  Tenjimashisuji Rokuchōme Station - Sakiasuji Line from Osaka Metro website
  Tenjimashisuji Rokuchōme Station - Tanimachi Line from Osaka Metro website
  Tenjimashisuji Rokuchōme Station - Tanimachi Line from Osaka Metro website

Railway stations in Japan opened in 1925
Railway stations in Osaka Prefecture
Osaka Metro stations